Southfield-Lathrup High School was a senior high school in Lathrup Village, Michigan, United States. It was the second oldest of three high schools in the Southfield Public Schools district, the oldest being Southfield High School, and the youngest being University High School Academy.

Southfield-Lathrup High School was well known for its extensive and well-supported music program. It was also known locally for its girls' basketball team State Title in 2005.

History, milestones, and awards

Southfield-Lathrup High School (SLHS) opened in 1967 to accommodate the growing Southfield and Lathrup Village populations. SLHS opened with the 1967-68 school year, accommodating Freshmen and Sophomores only from Birney Junior High School, one of four junior high schools in Southfield.  Adding a Freshman class in each of the following two school years, 1968–69 and 1969–70, it graduated its first Senior class in 1970. Located in Lathrup Village, the high school was part of the Southfield Public School District.

Southfield-Lathrup High School closed at the end of the 2015-16 school year, and its students were divided between Southfield High School and University High School Academy, which moved into Lathrup's campus.  Berkley High School, Groves High School, Shrine Catholic High School and Oak Park High School were also expected to receive some Southfield-Lathrup students.

Dress code
Beginning with the 2005–2006 school year, a dress code was instituted at the high school level, finalizing the process of bringing all of the Southfield Public Schools district under a dress code policy. All members of the board supported the measure and voted aye, except for Trustee Karen Miller.  Ms. Miller voted no because she didn't feel that there was enough input from students in the development of the dress code.

Campus
The campus consists of the main building, a soccer field, a football field, and various parking lots. Students park in the west parking lot. The building is divided into several distinct zones called "houses."

A, B, C, and D Wing
Four two-story wings contain most of the school's class rooms. Oddly, the second floors of these wings are not attached to each other. A and B wings are located toward the front of the school, facing Twelve Mile Road. C and D wings are located toward the rear of the building.

A House contains the Charger Cafe, which sells food items and Southfield-Lathrup-related memorabilia.

B House contains most of the science labs and the Medical and Natural Sciences Academy.

C House contains the Career Center and the majority of the math department.

D House contains the counseling office and the weight training rooms.

G House
G House contains the Arts and Communications Academy, Band Room, Choir Room, Piano Laboratory, Art Studios, Dance Studios, and the auditorium. Southfield-Lathrup's auditorium is equipped with a full sized stage, dressing room, costume room, lighting, and sound equipment. Every year, Lathrup's drama department produces a fall play and a spring musical. The spring musical typically includes Lathrup's dance and music departments.

Extracurricular activities
Newspaper – The Charger Chronicle
Yearbook – The Synthesis
Art Club
Gay-Straight Alliance
 Embrace The Difference
Lathrup's Lovely Ladies
Southfield-Lathrup High School Marching Band     "Marching Chargers"
Chess Club
DECA
Fashion Club
Student Congress
National Honor Society, http://www.southfield.k12.mi.us/education/club/club.php?sectionid=1511
Scholars Plus
Graduates "Distinguished Scholars" from the Southfield Public School System
Spanish Club
French Club
Intramural Sports Program
Anime Club

Curriculum

Academy learning
Southfield-Lathrup Senior High School is home to two of four Academies serving the Southfield Public Schools district, specifically the Medical and Natural Sciences Academy and the Arts and Communications Academy. Both academies have separate entry requirements from the mainstream curriculum. Most students apply at the end of their tenth grade year and take classes in their eleventh and twelfth grade years. The other two academies are the Engineering & Manufacturing Sciences Academy and the Global Business & Information Technology Academy, are located at Southfield High School

Medical and Natural Sciences Academy
Courses offered:
IB Biology
IB Chemistry
Health Careers & Health Skills Training
Anatomy and Physiology
Biotechnology

Arts and Communications Academy
Courses offered:
Vocal Music
Piano
Creative Writing
Dance Technique/Dance Company
Play Production
Visual Animation Lab
Acting
TV Production
Yearbook
School Newspaper
Orchestra

The Louise Ward Memorial Scholarship was established in 2001 for Southfield-Lathrup Students for continued studies in vocal music. The Fund was initiated by alumni of the Southfield Lathrup High School Madrigal Singers in grateful memory of Louise Ward who was, at once, their teacher, mentor, role model, and friend.

The Academy also won the 2000 GRAMMY signature award.

Advanced placement options
Southfield-Lathrup High also offers Advanced Placement (AP) courses in several different subjects including:

 United States History
 United States Government & Politics
 Biology
 Calculus
 Physics
 Environmental Science
 Chemistry
 Spanish Language
 English Language and Composition
 English Literature and Composition

In recent years, Southfield-Lathrup High School also offered Advanced Placement Physics, Statistics, European History, Spanish, and French. Though these courses aren't offered, students are encouraged to independently study the subject material and take the test.

Summer reading program
All Southfield-Lathrup High students are required to read books from a preselected list over the summer. Honors and AP English students receive more books to read than other students. AP United States History Students are also given summer reading.

Beginning the summer of 2006, all summer reading work was required to be submitted through mydropbox.com, an online plagiarism screening service.

Notable alumni
 Willie Beavers, professional football player
 Mike Chappell, c/o 1996, international professional basketball player.
 Daniel Gilbert, owner of the Cleveland Cavaliers, founder of Quicken Loans
 Jon Glaser, c/o 1986, actor, comedian, and TV writer/producer.
 Mark Howe, retired NHL defenseman
 Marty Howe, former professional ice hockey player
 Jason Jones, c/o 2004, professional American football player for the Detroit Lions
 Eric Lefkofsky, 1987, internet entrepreneur and co-founder of Groupon.
 Devyn Marble (born 1992), basketball player for Maccabi Haifa of the Israeli Basketball Premier League
 Steven Pitt (psychiatrist)
 Michael Stone, retired safety for the New England Patriots and New York Giants.

References

External links

Southfield Lathrup Senior High School Alumni

Public high schools in Michigan
Southfield, Michigan
Educational institutions established in 1968
Educational institutions disestablished in 2016
High schools in Oakland County, Michigan
1968 establishments in Michigan
2016 disestablishments in Michigan